Mytchikovo is a rural locality (a village) in Ivanovskoye Rural Settlement, Vashkinsky District, Vologda Oblast, Russia. The population was 19 as of 2002.

Geography 
Mytchikovo is located 51 km north of Lipin Bor (the district's administrative centre) by road. Ushakovo is the nearest rural locality.

References 

Rural localities in Vashkinsky District